Yago Bellón (born 28 August 1989) is a Swiss former association footballer.
 
Primarily right-footed, Bellón operated in midfield or as a full-back. Despite playing the majority of his career in his native Switzerland, Bellón was once a player for the academy of English Premier League side Aston Villa. His twin brother Damian Bellón was also a professional footballer and is now manages a side in Thailand. Yago now works in banking sector in Switzerland.

Career

Aston Villa
Bellón signed for English Premier League side Aston Villa from local side FC St. Gallen in 2006, along with his twin brother Damian. However, neither managed to get further than Villa's reserve side and were both released two years later.

Return to Switzerland
Yagó re-signed for previous club FC St. Gallen where he remained for one season, playing in their under-21 side.

At the end of the 2008–09 season, he joined FC Wil on a free transfer. Bellón made a total of 26 appearances for FC Wil, with 24 of those coming in the league. He dropped down a division to join FC Gossau in January 2011. In October 2011, he signed for FC Kreuzlingen on a free transfer. In September 2013, Bellón transferred to FC Tägerwilen.

Retirement
Bellón retired from semi-professional football in 2014 and retrained in the financial sector, and was working at the Thurgauer Kantonalbank in Switzerland in 2019.

Personal life
His twin brother Damian was also a professional footballer and is now manages MOF Customs United in Thai League 2. After retirement from football, Yagó commented how his father was incredibly strict and had made him and his brother train in isolation daily from a young age to achieve a professional contract, to the detriment of their school work and social life.

References

1989 births
Living people
Swiss men's footballers
Swiss people of Spanish descent
Sportspeople from St. Gallen (city)
Swiss twins
Twin sportspeople
Association football midfielders
FC Kreuzlingen players